The Day We Had Hitler Home is a 2000 novel by the Australian author Rodney Hall.

Awards and nominations

Miles Franklin Literary Award, 2001: shortlisted

External links

Reviews
"The Australian Public Intellectual Network" 
"The London Review of Books" 
"The Observer" 
"Words and Flavours" 

2000 Australian novels
Cultural depictions of Adolf Hitler
ALS Gold Medal winning works